The Chicken Chronicles is a 1977 American teen stoner comedy film set in 1969 and starring Steve Guttenberg.

Plot
David Kessler is a high school student who will go to any lengths to impress a pretty cheerleader and lose his virginity, while juggling his job at a chicken joint and trying not to get thrown out of Beverly Hills High - a fate that could get him sent to Vietnam.

Cast
Phil Silvers as Max Ober
Ed Lauter as Vice Principal Nastase 
Steve Guttenberg as David Kessler 
Lisa Reeves as Margaret Shaffer
Gino Baffa as Charlie Kessler
Meridith Baer as Tracy Vogel 
Branscombe Richmond as Mark 
Jon Gries as Tom 
Raven De La Croix as Mrs. Worth

Production
The film was based on a novel by Paul Diamond, the 23-year-old son of screenwriter I.A.L. Diamond. "It's a very funny very dirty book," said Diamond senior.

Film rights were sold to Paramount before publication. A screenplay was done by Ned Wynn in 1975 with Paul Monash the producer. The film was not made. However two years later Paul Diamond was working on a script for Avco Embassy.

It was the first lead role for Steve Guttenberg. "Some actors get embarrassed about their early work," Guttenberg said, "but we all don't start out as 'artistes.' Nobody is going to confuse "Chicken" with 'Citizen Kane' but I learned a lot. They took a chance with me. I didn't get rich on it but it was a start."

References

External links
The Chicken Chronicles at the TCM database.
 
 

1977 films
1970s sex comedy films
American high school films
American teen comedy films
Embassy Pictures films
1970s English-language films
Films about virginity
Films scored by Ken Lauber
Films set in 1969
Films set in Beverly Hills, California
Teen sex comedy films
1977 comedy films
Films directed by Frank Simon
1970s American films